Conal Bonnar (born 13 October 1969) is an Irish retired hurler. His league and championship career with the Tipperary senior team lasted twelve seasons from 1988 to 1999. 

Bonnar first appeared for the Cashel King Cormacs club at juvenile and underage levels, before eventually joining the club's senior team. The highlight of his club career came in 1991 when he won a Munster medal, having earlier won a county championship medal.

Bonanr made his debut on the inter-county scene when he was selected for the Tipperary minor team in 1986. He enjoyed one championship seasons with the minor team, however, he ended his tenure in this grade as an All-Ireland runner-up. Bonnar subsequently joined the under-21 team, winning an All-Ireland medal in 1989. By this stage he had also joined the Tipperary senior team after being drafted onto the panel for the 1988 All-Ireland final. Over the course of the following twelve seasons Bonnar enjoyed much success, culminating with the winning of All-Ireland medals in 1989 and 1991. He also won three Munster medals and two National League medals. He played his last game for Tipperary in June 1999. Bonnar was joined on the Tipperary team for much of his career by his brothers Colm and Cormac.

After being chosen on the Munster inter-provincial team for the first time in 1989, Bonnar made just one further appearance on the team and ended his career without a Railway Cup medal.

Honours

Team

Cashel King Cormacs
Munster Senior Club Hurling Championship (1): 1991
Tipperary Senior Hurling Championship (1): 1991

Tipperary
All-Ireland Senior Hurling Championship (2): 1989 (c), 1991
Munster Senior Hurling Championship (3): 1989 (c), 1991, 1993
National Hurling League (2): 1987-88, 1993-94
All-Ireland Under-21 Hurling Championship (1): 1989
Munster Under-21 Hurling Championship (1): 1989
Munster Minor Hurling Championship (1): 1987

Individual

Awards
All Stars Awards (2): 1989, 1991

References

1969 births
Living people
Cashel King Cormac's hurlers
UCD hurlers
Tipperary inter-county hurlers
Munster inter-provincial hurlers